"Sunday Sunday" is a song by English alternative rock band Blur, included on their second album, Modern Life Is Rubbish (1993). It was released 4 October 1993 as the final single from that album, and charted at number 26 on the UK Singles Chart. This is the highest-charting single from the album (although the lowest-selling single from the album); the record company thought the original album contained no singles, and had the band write the other two singles specifically for single release. The band's original name, 'Seymour', is credited as guest performer on the CD1 single, due to the B-sides being recordings from that era.

The song is about traditional British Sunday activities, like a Sunday roast, seeing family and a walk in the park. The song "Daisy Bell" is a B-side on CD 2. Singer Damon Albarn once mentioned that he would like to make music his grandparents would approve of. Graham Coxon has admitted that the cover versions of "Daisy Bell" and "Let's All Go Down the Strand" marked one of the worst moments in Blur's career. CD 2 is subtitled 'The Sunday Sunday Popular Community Song CD.

Critical reception
Alan Jones from Music Week gave "Sunday Sunday" four out of five, decribing it as "a retro-styled track, more direct and spivish than the usual Blur fare. Almost apeing "Lazy Sunday" in style but undeniably commercial, it's likely to prosper, especially as there are eight more tracks spread across the four formats."

B-sides
The B-sides on "Sunday Sunday" (Blur featuring Seymour) are previously unreleased tracks by Blur in their early days as Seymour, recorded in 1989. Originally, "Dizzy", "Fried" and "Shimmer" were only available on the CD, with "Tell Me, Tell Me" only available on the 7" and "Long Legged" and "Mixed Up" on the 12". In 1999 these were all compiled onto one disc in the 10 Yr Boxset. The only Seymour song released that wasn't a Blur featuring Seymour "Sunday Sunday" B-side was "Sing (to Me)", an early version of "Sing", which came out as a fan club single in 2000. The songs were not included on the career-spanning Blur 21 box set released in 2012, instead rehearsal demo versions of "Dizzy" and "Mixed Up" were included on Rarities One, which features in the set.

The CD2 single is subtitled as The Sunday Sunday Popular Community Song CD. The songs on the CD are music hall songs "Daisy Bell" and "Let's All Go Down the Strand". A fourth song was recorded, "For Old Times' Sake", but did not make it onto the EP. It is unknown why, but it was possibly deleted (the recording altogether). "Daisy Bell" and "Let's All Go Down the Strand" made it onto the 10 Yr Boxset in 1999 and the Blur 21 box set in 2012.

Track listings
All music was composed by Albarn, Coxon, James and Rowntree except where indicated.

 7-inch vinyl
 "Sunday Sunday" (Albarn, Coxon, James, Rowntree; Lyrics by Albarn) – 2:37
 "Tell Me, Tell Me" (featuring Seymour) – 3:37

 12-inch vinyl
 "Sunday Sunday" (Albarn, Coxon, James, Rowntree; Lyrics by Albarn) – 2:37
 "Long Legged" (featuring Seymour) – 2:23
 "Mixed Up" (featuring Seymour) – 3:01

 CD1 (Blur featuring Seymour)
 "Sunday Sunday" (Albarn, Coxon, James, Rowntree; Lyrics by Albarn) – 2:37
 "Dizzy" (featuring Seymour) – 3:24
 "Fried" (featuring Seymour) – 2:34
 "Shimmer" (featuring Seymour) – 4:40

 CD2 (The Popular Community Song CD)
 "Sunday Sunday" (Albarn, Coxon, James, Rowntree; Lyrics by Albarn) – 2:37
 "Daisy Bell" (Harry Dacre) – 2:48
 "Let's All Go Down the Strand" (Murphy, Castling) – 3:42

Personnel
 "Sunday Sunday" was produced by Steve Lovell
 "Daisy Bell" and "Let's All Go Down the Strand" were produced by Blur
 "Dizzy", "Fried", "Shimmer", "Long Legged" and "Mixed Up" were produced by Graeme Holdaway and Blur
 "Tell Me, Tell Me" was produced by Graeme Holdaway

Band
 Damon Albarn (singer, lyric writer, keyboards, organ)
 Graham Coxon (guitar)
 Alex James (bass)
 Dave Rowntree (drums)
 The Kick Horns (brass, "Sunday Sunday" only)

Charts

References

1992 songs
1993 singles
Blur (band) songs
Songs written by Alex James (musician)
Songs written by Damon Albarn
Songs written by Dave Rowntree
Songs written by Graham Coxon